Rob Lobel (born June 2, 1966 in Montreal, Quebec) is a Canadian curler from Thornhill, Ontario. He currently skips his own team out of Whitby, Ontario.

Career
Lobel played second for Steve Hartley at the 1984 Junior Provincial Curling Championship, in which the team won, earning them the right to represent Ontario at the 1984 Canadian Junior Curling Championships.

Lobel skipped his men's team to a fourth-place finish at the 2008 provincial championship, losing to Mike Harris in the 3-4 game. The following season, his team made it to the 2009 TSC Stores Tankard and placed sixth with a 4-5 record.

Lobel won a provincial senior mixed championship in 2017.

External links

1966 births
Living people
Curlers from Ontario
Curlers from Quebec
People from Thornhill, Ontario
Sportspeople from Montreal
Canadian male curlers